The Gilgit-Baltistan Police, formerly known as Northern Areas Police, is responsible for law enforcement in the Gilgit-Baltistan region of Pakistan. The mission of the GB Police is the prevention and detection of crime, maintenance of law and order and enforcement of the Constitution of Pakistan.

The current Inspector General of Gilgit-Baltistan Police is Saeed Wazir since March 2021.

IGPs of GB Police

See also
 Law enforcement in Pakistan

References

External links
Official website of Gilgit-Baltistan Police

Gilgit-Baltistan Police
Provincial law enforcement agencies of Pakistan
Government of Gilgit-Baltistan
Organizations established in 1970
1970 establishments in Pakistan
Government agencies established in 1970